Andreas Wolfram (27 February 1957 – 2001) was a German sport shooter. He was born in Leipzig. He competed at the 1988 Summer Olympics in the men's 50 metre rifle three positions event, in which he placed tenth; the men's 50 metre rifle prone event, in which he tied for 15th place; and the men's 10 metre air rifle event, in which he placed eighth.

References

External links
 

1957 births
2001 deaths
ISSF rifle shooters
German male sport shooters
Shooters at the 1988 Summer Olympics
Olympic shooters of East Germany
Sportspeople from Leipzig
20th-century German people